I Who Have Never Known Men, originally published in French as Moi qui n'ai pas connu les hommes, is a 1995 science fiction novel by Belgian author Jacqueline Harpman. It is the first of Harpman's novels to be translated into English. It was originally published by Seven Stories Press, then republished by Avon Eos.

Synopsis
Thirty-nine women and a girl are being held prisoner in a cage underground. The guards are all male, and never speak to them. The girl is the only one of the prisoners who has no memory of the outside world; none of them know why they are being held prisoner, or why there is one child among thirty-nine adults.

One day, an alarm sounds, and the guards flee; the prisoners are subsequently able to escape. They find themselves on an immense barren plain, with no other people anywhere, and no clue as to what has happened to the world.

Reception
The book was a finalist for the 1995 Prix Femina.

The New York Times described the novel as "bleak but fascinating", and "about as heavyhearted as fiction can get". Kirkus Reviews compared it to The Handmaid's Tale, and said that it is "thin", but "moving" and "powerful". L'Express called it "poignant" and "magnificent", and the product of a "profoundly original imagination".

References

External links

1995 Belgian novels
1995 science fiction novels
French-language novels
Belgian science fiction novels
Seven Stories Press books